Alamarathupatti village in Virudunagar district
 Alamarathupatty village in Dindigul district
 Alamarathupatti, a village in Kolathur block in Salem district